Kimberly Meltzer (born January 1, 1964) is a former member Michigan House of Representatives.

Early life
Meltzer was born on January 1, 1964.

Education
Meltzer earned a B.A. from Wayne State University in political science and educational certifications in urban and rural planning from Michigan State University.

Career
Meltzer served on the Clinton Township Board from 2000 to 2004. On November 7, 2006, Meltzer was elected to the Michigan House of Representatives where she represented the 33rd district from January 1, 2007 to 2010. Meltzer did not win re-election in 2010.

Personal life
Meltzer married Clarence around 1990. Together, they had three children.

References

Living people
1964 births
Wayne State University alumni
Michigan State University alumni
Women state legislators in Michigan
Republican Party members of the Michigan House of Representatives
20th-century American women
21st-century American women politicians
21st-century American politicians
20th-century American people